Ward Valley is an ice-free valley that lies between Porter Hills and Xanadu Hills and east of the snout of Ward Glacier in the Denton Hills, Scott Coast, Antarctica. Named by US-ACAN (1994) in association with Ward Glacier and Ward Lake.

References 

Valleys of Victoria Land
Scott Coast